This is a list of electoral results for the Eumemmerring Province in Victorian state elections.

Members for Eumemmerring Province

Election results

Elections in the 2000s

Elections in the 1990s

Elections in the 1980s

References

Victoria (Australia) state electoral results by district